This is a list of rivers  in Somalia. This list is arranged by drainage basin, with respective tributaries indented under each larger stream's name.

Indian Ocean

From south to north:

Bushbush (Buscbusc)
Caannoole
Baddana
Jubba River
Lagh Dera
Lak Bor
Lagh Kutulo
Lagh Bissigh
Lagh Bogal
Shebelle River
Bohol Madagoi
Dudumey (Duddum)
Dawa River
Eyl River (Nugaal, Nogel)  
Togdheer River (Dheer, Der)
Dhuudo (Dhud, Dudo))
Tuddi
Jaceyl (Jaceel, Giahel)
Dhud (Dahot)
Jaceel (Giael)
Hodmo
Madgiid
Biyoguure
Baba
Ceelcaanood
Faruur
Bararis
Durdur
Silil
Beyadé

Interior

Ban Dulad

References

Rand McNally, The New International Atlas,1993.
Defense Mapping Agency, 1974
 GEOnet Names Server

Somalia
Rivers